Maâmar Youcef (born October 3, 1989) is an Algerian football player who plays for JSM Béjaïa in the Algerian Ligue Professionnelle 2.

Club career
On August 6, 2009, Youcef made his professional debut for ASO Chlef as a starter in a league game against USM El Harrach.

International career
In July 2011, Youcef was a member of the Algeria National Military Team that won the World Military Cup in Rio de Janeiro. He started in the final against Egypt, which Algeria won 1–0.

Honours

Club
 ASO Chlef
 Algerian Ligue Professionnelle 1
 Winner: 2010–11

Country
 Algeria
 World Military Cup
 Winner: 2011

References

External links
 

1989 births
Algerian footballers
Algerian Ligue Professionnelle 1 players
ASO Chlef players
Living people
Association football defenders
21st-century Algerian people